Vaiga was a small landlocked ancient Estonian county in the eastern part of the territory of Estonia. It territory now belongs to the eastern part of Jõgeva County.

See also 
Livonian Crusade

References

External links 
Kuidas elasid inimesed vanasti, möödunud sajandil ja praegu (Estonian)
9. - 13. saj.pärinevad Eesti aardeleiud (Estonian)
Eesti haldusjaotus ja võõrvõimude vaheldumine läbi aegade (Estonian)

Ancient counties of Estonia